Playing Cards is an 1896 French  black-and-white silent actuality film by Georges Méliès. It was the first film in Méliès' prolific career, and thus is number one in his Star Film catalogue. It is a remake of Louis Lumière's film The Messers. Lumière at Cards, which was released earlier the same year. Along with Georges Méliès himself, his brother Gaston Méliès and daughter Georgette Méliès both appear in the film.

Synopsis
It is afternoon in a French garden. Three men are sitting at a table, two of them playing cards while the third smokes and reads a newspaper. The man who is not playing cards calls over a young girl and has her fetch a woman with a bottle of wine. He proceeds to pour glasses for himself and his friends. After drinking the wine, the man reads a story out of the newspaper, and his friends laugh.

Survival
The film, long presumed lost, was rediscovered after 1981 and included on a home video release in 2008.

References

External links
 

1896 films
1896 directorial debut films
French silent short films
French black-and-white films
Films directed by Georges Méliès
1890s rediscovered films
1896 short films
Rediscovered French films
Playing cards
1890s French films
Films about card games